Bolton Street is a street in the City of Westminster, London. The street runs from Curzon Street in the north to Piccadilly in the south.

History

Bolton Street, which was named after the Duke of Bolton, and which until 1708 was the westernmost street of London, was built in about 1696.

Notable inhabitants

Former residents of Bolton Street include:
Madame D'Arblay (pseudonym Fanny Burney), playwright, at No. 11. Her former residence is marked by a brown plaque erected by the Society of Arts;
Richard Clement (1754 - 1829), sugar plantation owner of Barbados, at No. 13 
Colonel Thomas Moody, Kt., a British geopolitical expert to the British Colonial Office, at No. 23;
Henry James, novelist, at No. 3.;
John Pitt Dening, soldier and polo player, who shot himself at the Bolton House Hotel in the street in 1929.

Buildings
The western side of the street has been almost completely replaced by modern buildings but the eastern side still contains many Georgian buildings. Among the listed buildings in the street are numbers 11, 13, 14, 15, 16, 17 and 18, 19 and 20. The auction house Noonans Mayfair has its office at number 16.

References

External links 

Streets in the City of Westminster